Brazilian Squash Confederation (Portuguese: Confederação Brasileira de Squash) is the governing body of squash federations and clubs in Brazil.

External links
 Official site

Squash
National members of the World Squash Federation
Squash in Brazil